"Coming Undone" is a song written and recorded by American band Korn and The Matrix for Korn's seventh studio album, See You on the Other Side. It was released as the album's second single in February 2006.

Chart performance
The song reached number four on Billboards Mainstream Rock Songs chart and number fourteen on the Alternative Songs chart. It also peaked at number seventy-nine on the Hot 100, making it Korn's fourth biggest hit on the chart.

Charts

Live performance
The song is frequently played live, most recently as a combination with Queen's "We Will Rock You" during the first chorus. It is the only song from See You on the Other Side that has remained a staple of their live set. It has also been performed several times on television, including Jimmy Kimmel Live! and Spike TV's Scream Awards.

Music video
The video was directed by Little X, his second time behind the lens for a rock band. The video begins with Korn performing in a desert in broad daylight. The sky begins to shatter like glass during the chorus to reveal a night sky. Later, the whole background shatters, leaving a plain white background. Lastly, they literally become undone while continuing to perform, and as they do, they resemble slinkies. The band is completely unraveled and gone by the ending of the video.

Appearances in media
Former Detroit Tigers third baseman Brandon Inge used the song as his walkup song when batting. It was also used as the walkup song for Hunter Pence when he played for the Philadelphia Phillies. It was also featured in a commercial for the CBS crime drama series Criminal Minds and in the video games Blitz: The League and The Bigs 2. An instrumental version is used for the TNA wrestler Frankie Kazarian, also known as Kaz. It also appeared in VH1's "100 Most Shocking Music Moments" in the discussion of the Woodstock 1999; both "Did My Time" and "Coming Undone" are heard in the background.

Track listing

UK release
7" VUS323
"Coming Undone (Dave Bascombe Radio Edit)" – 3:03
"Eaten Up Inside" – 3:18

CD5" VUSCD323
"Coming Undone (Dave Bascombe Radio Edit)" – 3:03
"Eaten Up Inside" – 3:18

Mash-up
Korn and Atlanta crunk rappers Dem Franchize Boyz did a mash-up of their respective hit singles at the time, "Coming Undone" and "Lean wit It, Rock wit It", titled "Coming Undone wit It". It was produced by Jermaine Dupri and Scott Spock from The Matrix, and was first released on AOL in April 2006. A video for "Coming Undone wit It" was released on the DVD portion of Chopped, Screwed, Live and Unglued. This is the official remix to both songs.

Various elements of the two songs were combined with new parts exclusive to the mashup, produced by Scott Spock of The Matrix.

Track listing
CD5" 66844 2
"Coming Undone wit It" (radio version) – 3:30
"Coming Undone wit It" (album version) – 3:30
"Coming Undone wit It" (instrumental) – 3:30
"Coming Undone wit It" (a cappella) – 3:30

References

External links
 

2005 songs
2006 singles
Korn songs
Music videos directed by Director X
Songs written by Lauren Christy
Songs written by Graham Edwards (musician)
Songs written by Scott Spock
Song recordings produced by the Matrix (production team)
Songs written by Reginald Arvizu
Songs written by Jonathan Davis
Songs written by James Shaffer
Songs written by David Silveria